Carrickmore St Colmcille's is a Gaelic Athletic Association Gaelic football club based in Carrickmore, Tyrone, Northern Ireland.

Roll of honour
 Tyrone Senior Football Championship (15)
 1940, 1943, 1949, 1961, 1966, 1969, 1977, 1978, 1979, 1995, 1996, 1999, 2001, 2004, 2005

Notable players
 Conor Gormley
 Martin Penrose

 Frankie Donnelly

References

External links
 Official website

Gaelic games clubs in County Tyrone
Gaelic football clubs in County Tyrone